Frank Carrodus (born 31 May 1949) is an English former professional footballer who played as a winger. In his career Carrodus played in the Football League for Manchester City, Aston Villa, Wrexham, Birmingham City and Bury.

Manchester City
Carrodus had to compete with Francis Lee for a place in the City team for the 1974 League Cup Final. Lee was declared fit and manager, Ron Saunders dropped Carrodus to the subs bench.

Aston Villa
Saunders and Carrodus both moved to Villa. This time Carrodus was to feature in the first two matches of the 1977 League Cup Final. But he missed out on the victory game having tore knee ligaments in a match against Derby following the first Replay.

Carrodus suffered further injuries in the 1978–79 season. He had already missed four games with a thigh strain when a cartilage operation in October sidelined him for two months.

References

1949 births
Living people
People from Altrincham
English footballers
Association football wingers
Altrincham F.C. players
Manchester City F.C. players
Aston Villa F.C. players
Wrexham A.F.C. players
Birmingham City F.C. players
Bury F.C. players
Witton Albion F.C. players
Runcorn F.C. Halton players
Macclesfield Town F.C. players
English Football League players